Pachnistis morologa is a moth in the family Autostichidae. It was described by Edward Meyrick in 1923. It is found in Angola.

References

Endemic fauna of Angola
Moths described in 1923
Pachnistis
Taxa named by Edward Meyrick